Jozef Čierny (born May 13, 1974 in Zvolen, Czechoslovakia, now Slovakia) is a retired professional ice hockey left winger.

Career 
He was drafted by the Buffalo Sabres in the second round, 35th overall, of the 1992 NHL Entry Draft.  He appeared in just one game in the National Hockey League, appearing for the Edmonton Oilers during the 1993–94 NHL season. He went scoreless in the game, going -1 in a game against the Ottawa Senators.

Čierny played three seasons in Germany's Deutsche Eishockey Liga before playing for his hometown HKm Zvolen in the Slovak Extraliga. In November 2008, he received a try-out at Graz 99ers but was unsuccessful on obtaining a contract and instead signed a contract in January 2009 with HYS The Hague in Eredivisie.

Career statistics

See also
List of players who played only one game in the NHL

External links

1974 births
AaB Ishockey players
Buffalo Sabres draft picks
Cape Breton Oilers players
Detroit Vipers players
EC Bad Tölz players
Edmonton Oilers players
Graz 99ers players
HC '05 Banská Bystrica players
HC 07 Detva players
HK Spišská Nová Ves players
HKM Zvolen players
HYS The Hague players
Living people
Long Beach Ice Dogs (IHL) players
Nürnberg Ice Tigers players
Sportspeople from Zvolen
Rochester Americans players
Slovak ice hockey left wingers
Czechoslovak ice hockey left wingers
Expatriate ice hockey players in the Netherlands
Expatriate ice hockey players in Austria
Expatriate ice hockey players in Denmark
Expatriate ice hockey players in Romania
Slovak expatriate ice hockey players in the United States
Slovak expatriate ice hockey players in Canada
Slovak expatriate sportspeople in  the Netherlands
Slovak expatriate sportspeople in  Austria
Slovak expatriate ice hockey players in Germany
Slovak expatriate sportspeople in  Denmark
Slovak expatriate sportspeople in  Romania